Ismaila is an African name that may refer to
Given name
Ismaila Atte-Oudeyi (born 1985), Togolese footballer
Ismaila Isa Funtua (1942–2020), Nigerian statesman
Ismaila Gwarzo, Nigerian National Security Advisor 
Ismaila Jagne (born 1984), Gambian football midfielder
Ismaila Jome (born 1994), Gambian footballer  
Ismaila Lassissi (born 1969), Ivorian rugby union footballer
Ismaïla Manga (1957–2015), Senegalese Jola painter 
Ismaïla N'Diaye (born 1988), Senegalese football player 
Jean-Ismaila Niang (born 1987), Senegalese football player 
Ismaila Sané, Senegalese-born percussionist, singer and solo dancer 
Ismaila Sanyang, Agricultural Minister of the Republic of the Gambia 
Ismaïla Sarr (born 1998), Senegalese football player 
Ismaïla Sy (born 1979), French basketball player 

Surname
Halimat Ismaila (born 1984), Nigerian track and field athlete